Dragged Across Concrete is a 2018 American neo-noir crime thriller film written and directed by S. Craig Zahler. It stars an ensemble cast that includes Mel Gibson, Vince Vaughn, Tory Kittles, Michael Jai White, Jennifer Carpenter, Laurie Holden, Fred Melamed, Udo Kier, Thomas Kretschmann, and Don Johnson. The story follows two childhood friends and two police detectives that are suspended for police brutality who in a desperate need for money, are embroiled in a robbery done by a professional thief.

Zahler started working on Dragged Across Concrete right after he finished development of his previous film Brawl in Cell Block 99, which also starred Vaughn, Carpenter, and Johnson. Vaughn recommended Zahler to Gibson, who he previously worked with in Hacksaw Ridge, and Gibson agreed to star in the film, later followed by Kittles and White. Filming took place in Vancouver, British Columbia between July and September 2017 under a production budget of $15 million.

It premiered at the 75th Venice International Film Festival on September 3, 2018, and received a limited theatrical and video-on-demand simultaneous release from Summit Entertainment on March 22, 2019. It was met with a mixed to positive critical reception, with praise directed toward Gibson's performance as well as its dark setting and themes; although it was criticized for its lengthy runtime, excessive violence, and what some critics perceived as right-wing bias due to its treatment on racism and police brutality. The film received several nominations at the 45th Saturn Awards, but was also shortlisted for "Worst Reckless Disregard for Human Life and Public Property" at the 40th Golden Raspberry Awards.

Plot
In the fictional city of Bulwark, recent parolee Henry Johns chastises his mother for returning to prostitution and taking drugs, before reuniting with his handicapped younger brother Ethan.

Three weeks later, police detectives Brett Ridgeman and Anthony Lurasetti are suspended without pay by the police department after a video leaked online revealing them committing police brutality on a drug dealer. Both detectives are desperate for money, with Ridgeman needing cash to move to a safer neighborhood for his family, while Lurasetti stalls in proposing to his girlfriend Denise. On a tip from Friedrich, a wealthy businessman with criminal connections, Ridgeman recruits Lurasetti to help him surveil and rob Lorentz Vogelmann, a professional thief.

Henry and his childhood friend Biscuit are hired by Vogelmann as getaway drivers, whose men, Black Gloves and Grey Gloves, have committed a series of robberies to buy a customized bulletproof van. Vogelmann and his crew then rob a bank, taking the employees and customers as hostages. A bank employee, Kelly Summers, who came back to work from her maternity leave, is shot and executed by the bank robbers after preventing a colleague from notifying the police via email. The thieves castrate the bank manager and then escape with the bullion and a hostage, Cheryl, while being tailed by Ridgeman and Lurasetti, which Henry notices. Unsettled by Vogelmann and his henchmen's brutality, Henry and Biscuit are then forced to surrender their weapons. Realizing they may be killed, Henry chooses not to reveal to Biscuit or the thieves that they are being followed by the detectives. Lurasetti learns of the atrocities committed by the thieves and berates Ridgeman for not intervening sooner or notifying the authorities, but Ridgeman asserts that law enforcement would be too late, and only the two of them can deal with the thieves. Lurasetti opts against delaying his marriage proposal to Denise and leaves her a voicemail guiding her to the engagement ring.

Arriving at a garage in the countryside, Biscuit leaps out of the van and is shot, as Henry wounds Grey Gloves with a hidden gun. Mortally wounded, Biscuit swallows the van's key; imploring Henry to take care of his mother and later is shot dead by thieves. Cheryl is sent to pull Biscuit's body into the van and Black Gloves cuts the key out of Biscuit's stomach, as Ridgeman and Lurasetti arrive and ram the van, knocking it over. Threatened by Vogelmann, Cheryl seemingly escapes from the van and as Lurasetti attempts to rescue her, shoots Lurasetti, mortally wounding him, before being executed by Ridgeman. Ridgeman then quickly kills Black Gloves as he exits the van. Ridgeman hands the dying Lurasetti his phone and he listens to a voicemail from Denise who declines his proposal before succumbing to his wounds.

Ridgeman fills the van with tear gas, and kills Gray Gloves just as he surrenders. Before he can torch the van, Henry fires a warning shot and insists the valuable contents of the van be spared. Ridgeman climbs on top of the van and kills Vogelmann before the latter can shoot him through the retractable slit. Henry shoots Ridgeman in the foot and reveals that he has recorded the entire incident on his cellphone and identifies Ridgeman as a detective. Disarming Henry, Ridgeman proposes they split the score, and together they load the bodies and the bullion in the getaway car. Towing Lurasetti's car to a dump site, Ridgeman reveals a hidden firearm and threatens Henry to delete the video. Henry and Ridgeman both shoot at each other, with Henry mortally wounding Ridgeman. Henry agrees with the dying Ridgeman to bury Lurasetti and take care of Ridgeman's family and later buries all the bodies and promises the deceased Biscuit that he will return and give a proper burial.

Eleven months later, Henry lives in a lavish mansion with his mother and brother. He sends Ridgeman's family a package containing a share of the gold bullion.

Cast

Production

Development 
On February 1, 2017, right after finishing production of his previous film Brawl in Cell Block 99, S. Craig Zahler signed to direct Dragged Across Concrete, a crime thriller based on police brutality, from a screenplay he had written. The script is 162 pages long and remained unchanged at the time of filming, and is Zahler's favorite screenplay to write. The story is influenced from the film The Killing directed by Stanley Kubrick and the films Dog Day Afternoon and Prince of the City directed by Sidney Lumet, of which Prince of the City being one of Zahler's favorite films.

Zahler is more interested in building the world of his scripts than writing the plots, and had the film touch on sensitive topics such as racism. He writes to his own liking and doesn't care about the audience's reactions as he is not chasing a mass audience. Zahler states: "I’m aware there are lines and moments in my films and books and future movies that will land poorly for some people or get people to hate me. That is your right. I have a right to do my own vision and hope it’s enough to get me to the next one." In an interview with The Daily Beast, Zahler states that the intent of the film is not to address societal ills or invoke a provocation, but to explore "splitting hairs in terms of what the difference is" between the societal issues. Zahler exemplifies Brett Ridgeman, one of the characters in the film, is "an embittered guy, not really happy with his station in life, and with a heavy hand, and doing some stuff that he shouldn’t be doing, and he’s suspended" and trying to get himself out of the hole that he dug with all of these mistakes. Vince Vaughn, who plays Brett's partner Anthony Lurasetti, states that Dragged Across Concrete is "not an agenda movie" but a morality tale.

Dragged Across Concrete has slice of life scenes not related to the plot progression, such as Jennifer Carpenter's character Kelly Summer not wanting to leave her child for work, Vince Vaughn's character Anthony Lurasetti eating a sandwich in a car, and Tory Kittles' character Henry Johns talking to Michael Jai White's character "Biscuit" about their childhoods, and are some of Zahler's favorite scenes in the film. Despite these scenes taking a lot of the running time in the film, Zahler believes that coupled with the atmosphere and the subsequent twists, the scenes result in the characters becoming more interesting than the plot.

Keith Kjarval of Unified Pictures produced the film along with Zahler and Dallas Sonnier of Cinestate, Assemble Media's Jack Heller, and Sefton Fincham of Look to the Sky Films, with Kjarval's Unified Film Fund financing. The project sought a distributor at the European Film Market at the 67th Berlin International Film Festival in February 2017. In May 2017, Lionsgate acquired the US distribution rights to the film, and would release it through its subsidiary, Summit Entertainment.

Casting 

Vince Vaughn starred in S. Craig Zahler's previous film Brawl in Cell Block 99 as the lead character Bradley Thomas. Vaughn gave the script of Dragged Across Concrete to Mel Gibson, who worked with Vaughn in the 2016 film Hacksaw Ridge as the film director, asking him to star in the film and recommended him to watch Brawl in Cell Block 99. Zahler was able to contact Gibson through Vaughn and hoped that he would star in the film. On February 1, 2017, Gibson signed on to the film, with him and Vaughn starring as police officers that are suspended due to committing police brutality.

On August 2, 2017, Jennifer Carpenter and Don Johnson, who had worked with Zahler in Brawl in Cell Block 99, signed onto the film, followed by Tory Kittles, Michael Jai White, Tattiawna Jones, and Laurie Holden. Since Vaughn and Gibson are both well-known conservatives in Hollywood, The Daily Beast claims this may hinder the financing of the film. However, Zahler believes they are the perfect match for their respective roles, and the studio is willing to give more funds to the film's production after Vaughn and Gibson's casting. Zahler praised Gibson for his collaboration and acting in the film. Gibson previously played a police officer in the 1987 film Lethal Weapon, but the film had no bearing on the script nor the casting changes of Dragged Across Concrete.

Filming 

Principal photography on the film began in Vancouver, British Columbia on July 17, 2017  and wrapped on September 16, 2017. Zahler wants Dragged Across Concrete to be seen as realistic by the audience, filming an actual car collision on set for one of the scenes rather than supplemented in the editing room. Shooting of the film is extremely challenging due to complex and dangerous stunts when filming a broken window, a car crash, or someone being shot. Dragged Across Concrete is less violent than Zahler's previous films Bone Tomahawk and Brawl in Cell Block 99 due to the difference in weapons and fighting styles utilized by the characters.

Music 

The film's soundtrack was composed by S. Craig Zahler and his friend Jeff Herriott, having previously worked together in Bone Tomahawk and Brawl in Cell Block 99. The duo wrote several soul pieces and recruiting the rhythm and blues group The O'Jays to sing the songs. Zahler was influenced by jazz musicians such as Charles Mingus and John Coltrane in creating the soundtrack.

Lakeshore Records released the soundtrack on March 22, 2019, in CD, Digital, and Vinyl formats, which coincided with the release date of the film. Pat Padua of The Washington Post called some of the music pieces "slightly jarring, but they contribute to a sense of reality that is at once familiar and unsettling."

Release
In May 2017, Lionsgate acquired the US distribution rights to the film, and would release it through its subsidiary, Summit Entertainment. The film's world premiere was at the 75th Venice International Film Festival on September 3, 2018. Dragged Across Concrete was then given a theatrical and video on demand release in the United States on March 22, 2019.

Dragged Across Concrete was released on digital download, DVD and Blu-ray disc in the United States under Lionsgate Films on April 30, 2019, including two special features, a short featurette titled Moral Conflict: Creating Cinema That Challenges and a forty-minute 3-part featurette, Elements of a Crime. Studio Canal released it in the U.K. on August 19, 2019, across all three formats.

Critical response
Dragged Across Concrete received positive reviews from critics and audiences alike, with praise directed towards Gibson's performance, worldbuilding, and the dark themes and criticism directed towards the lengthy runtime and excessive violence. Reception was more polarized on the film's treatment of racism and police brutality, with some reviewers claiming the film endorses right-wing ideology. 

The website's consensus reads, "As grim and grinding as its title, Dragged Across Concrete opts for slow-burning drama instead of high-speed thrills — and has just the right cast to make it work." On Metacritic, the film has an average score of 60 out of 100, based on 28 critics, indicating "mixed or average reviews".

Kevin Maher of The Times gave the film four out of five stars, writing: "in this new, bleak and often unexpectedly grand genre movie (it’s essentially a buddy-cop flick, but with operatic ambitions), the thread out of place, both irritably scratching and strangely arresting, is Mel Gibson." 

Peter Bradshaw of The Guardian also rated Dragged Across Concrete four out of five stars, stating: "this is a long film, but there is something so horribly compelling about its unhurried slouch towards the precipice." 

David Fear of Rolling Stone awarded the film a three and a half out of five stars, praising Gibson's performance and the world-building: "Dragged Across Concrete is apt to send crime-film fanatics, especially ones who prefer their pulp nasty, brutish and incredibly long, into frothing fits of glee." 

Kieran Fisher of Film School Rejects praised the dialogue interactions between the detectives, Kittles' performance, and Zahler's intention to challenge the moral position of the audience, while acknowledging that the film will attract controversy: "Still, if you just want to see a great crime epic that cares more about telling a great story than promoting an agenda, you’ll want to check out Dragged Across Concrete. It’s going to be a contender for the best of 2019 when it’s all said and done, even if some viewers will feel guilty about enjoying it so much." 

Armond White of National Review praised it as a conservative action film, writing that it "vividly conveys the feeling of suffering, bitterness, and struggle"; later rating it among the 20 best films of the decade.

Accolades 
At the 40th Golden Raspberry Awards, Dragged Across Concrete was nominated in a new category, "Worst Reckless Disregard for Human Life and Public Property." WhatCulture criticized the nomination, saying that it "feels  as though voters just wanted to nominate Joker for the enormous social media publicity it would generate, and then shaped a dubious awards category around it. Dragged Across Concrete is an even weirder pick, though, both because of its low-budget nature and the fact that there's not that much carnage in it. Michael Bay's 6 Underground is clearly a far worthier nominee than either of those films, given how much obvious human collateral damage is racked up amid the chaotic action sequences."

References

External links 
 
 
 

2018 films
American action thriller films
2018 action thriller films
Films shot in Vancouver
Summit Entertainment films
2010s heist films
American heist films
Films about organized crime in the United States
American neo-noir films
Films directed by S. Craig Zahler
2010s English-language films
2010s American films